Joel M. Reed (December 29, 1933 – April 13, 2020) was an American film director, producer and screenwriter.
Joel Reed has been in many films including deadeye and he plays Uncle Joe in Louis Marino film The Dysfunctional Mob.

Career
Reed is best known for directing the controversial Blood Sucking Freaks  (1976), a notorious horror comedy that was the subject of protests upon its initial release and has since achieved cult status.

Reed also directed the films Career Bed (1968), Sex by Advertisement (1969), The G.I. Executioner (Wit's End / Dragon Lady / Wild Dragon Lady; 1971), Blood Bath (Terror / Night and the City; 1976),Blood Sucking Freaks  (1976) and Night of the Zombies (Gamma 693 / Sister of Death / Battalion of the Living Dead; 1981). Reed wrote all the scripts of the movies he directed.

Reed wrote and directed Blood Bath, which was produced by the Trans-Orient Entertainment Corporation and had a budget of $100,000. In a 1974 interview with The New York Times, he described the film as a "contemporary, episodic occult-horror adventure". Harve Presnell starred in the film as a producer of horror films who arranges in his studio a Black Mass.

On March 1, 1990, Masquerade Books published a book that Reed wrote on Donald Trump called Trump: the Man, the Myth, the Scandal.

In 2011 Reed made a comeback as an actor playing the main character Uncle Joe in the film Dead Eye, directed by Louis Affortunato. After that, Reed acted in eight more films: I Spill Your Guts (2012); Supernaturalz: Weird, Creepy & Random (2012); Trashtastic (2013); Catch of the Day (2014); The Fappening (2015); Vault of Terror II: The Undead (2015); Freak in a Basement (2018); and The Dysfunctional Mob.

In May 2012, Reed signed with Polus Books, which released the books Zombie Wall and Outrage: Hitler Didn't Die.

On September 17, 2018 a book by author John Szpunar was released by Headpress about Reed called Blood Sucking Freak: The Life and Films of the Incredible Joel M. Reed. 

Reed was Interviewed December 2018 for a documentary about himself called Reed Unbound: The Joel M. Reed Story (2019) which chronicles his whole life and film career and was directed by Jerry Landi and Adrian Esposito.

Death
Reed died on April 13, 2020, aged 86, in a care facility in New York City after contracting COVID-19.

References

External links

1933 births
2020 deaths
Writers from Brooklyn
Film directors from New York City
American male screenwriters
Film producers from New York (state)
Screenwriters from New York (state)
Horror film directors
Deaths from the COVID-19 pandemic in New York (state)